The United Kingdom of Great Britain and Northern Ireland competed as Great Britain at the 1948 Winter Olympics in St. Moritz, Switzerland.

Medallists

Alpine skiing

Men

Men's combined

The downhill part of this event was held along with the main medal event of downhill skiing. For athletes competing in both events, the same time was used (see table above for the results). The slalom part of the event was held separate from the main medal event of slalom skiing (included in table below).

Women

Women's combined

The downhill part of this event was held along with the main medal event of downhill skiing. For athletes competing in both events, the same time was used (see table above for the results). The slalom part of the event was held separate from the main medal event of slalom skiing (included in table below).

Bobsleigh

Figure skating

Men

Women

Pairs

Ice hockey

The tournament was run in a round-robin format with nine teams participating.

* United States team was disqualified.  Only eight teams are officially ranked.

Great Britain 5-4 Austria
Canada 3-0 Great Britain
Czechoslovakia 11-4 Great Britain
Switzerland 12-3 Great Britain
Great Britain 7-2 Poland
Sweden 4-3 Great Britain
USA 4-3 Great Britain
Great Britain 14-7 Italy

Skeleton

Speed skating

Men

References

 Olympic Winter Games 1948, full results by sports-reference.com

Nations at the 1948 Winter Olympics
1948
Olympics
Winter sports in the United Kingdom